The IAR 12 is a Romanian low-wing monoplane fighter-trainer aircraft designed before World War II.

Design and development
The failure of the first fighter designed at Brașov did not discourage the energetic team of the I.A.R. Works. Even before the second prototype of the C.V. 11 was disqualified from the fighter contest, the first details of its successor had already been laid out by Engineer-in-Chief Elie Carafoli.  A new tail with enlarged rudder was fitted to essentially the same fuselage, giving a more conventional look and offering better control during flight. As a consequence, the overall height increased by more than a meter, i.e., 40% of the original dimension. Unlike the IAR 11 design, the wingtips were rounded, and the span had been increased as well, giving a  wing area compared to the original  of the C.V. 11. An anti-crash pylon with a minuscule Venturi-tube installed at its top appeared behind the cockpit to protect the pilot in case the aircraft overturned.

The powerplant chosen for the new aircraft, named I.A.R. 12, was again a Lorraine-Dietrich 12Eb, that offered 450 h.p. (336 kW) at 1,900 r.p.m., similar to the type fitted to the first C.V. 11. This unsatisfactory result, combined with poor handling characteristics experienced during early test flights, constrained Carafoli to improve the construction and try a new engine, fitted to essentially the same fuselage, giving a more conventional look and offering better control during flight. An anti-crash pylon with a minuscule Venturi-tube installed at its top appeared behind the cockpit to protect the pilot in case the aircraft overturned. Such a feature on the C.V. 11 C1 could have saved the life of Cpt. Popescu on that fatal day in early December 1931.

Operators

Royal Romanian Air Force

Specifications (IAR 12)

See also

References

Bibliography

1930s Romanian fighter aircraft
12
Low-wing aircraft
Single-engined tractor aircraft
Aircraft first flown in 1933